The Inn (Chinese: 亲爱的·客栈) is a Chinese variety show aired on Hunan Broadcasting Station. In the variety show, a couple will manage an inn with a company of friends as guest for 20 days. The Inn shared the same production team with another variety show by Hunan Broadcasting System, Divas Hits The Road.

Content 
The Inn focuses on the hospitality of two innocent couples towards their friends (guest) who spent 20 days running the inn together, and opening up to each other by sharing stories of their lives and their own past. On certain episodes, the production team invites mysterious guests as "volunteers" and the former will work together with the five "masters" in the show. Once guests have checked into the inn, the production team will give each of them a star, and guests will vote for one of their favorite employees from among the three at the end of their stay. In season 2, the only difference is the cast & new location of Arxan Mongolia.

Production 
The Inn was successfully proposed on August 3, 2017, and the site of recording was confirmed on August 18. On September 10, principal photography started at the Lugu Lake Scenic Area of Liangshan in Sichuan Province. Filming was completed on September 30, with duration that took less than two months to be completed. The show broadcast was the succeeder for the time slot for "Chinese Restaurant" on Hunan Broadcasting System, and broadcast every Saturday at 22:00 since October 7, 2017.

The production team employed a surveillance photography-based approach whereby the team installed 72 monitoring booths and another 16 motorized hidden cameras around the inn. Production team for The Inn doesn't provide the cast members with clear-cut instructions and missions, resulting in a largely unscripted show. The production team adopted a 24-hour non-interference shooting mode, recording all the details of the cast members. The staff carries out a 24-hour shift system, with an average of about 17–18 hours per person per day.

Cast

Boss and Lady Boss

Season 1

Season 2
Wu Yi
Shen Yue
Kido Ma
Dylan Wang 
Zheng Xiaolin
Zhang Yunfeng 
Zheng Xiaoli
Caesar Wu
Yang Zi
Cheng Xiao

Season 3
Hans Zhang
Leo Wu
Ruby Lin
Li Landi
Chen Xiang 
Ma Tianyu

Dishes 
 Sweet and sour lemon fish：首先制作酱料
 Potato Smoked Chicken
 Curry Chicken Wing
 Braised chicken feet
 Red Wine Pork Rib
 Braised Fish
 Matsutake Coq au vin Chicken
 Chopped chilli pepper fish head
 Dried tomato chicken wing
 Golden Triangle Tofu
 Fried rice
 Sesame cookie

Staff with the most stars

Guests

Season 1
Jackson Yee (Episode 1-3)
Yang Zi (Episode 5-7)
Li Fei'er, Yuan Zihui, Cheng Pei-pei (Episode 7-8)

Season 2
Myolie Wu (Episode 1-2)
Chen Xiang (Episode 3)
Shen Yue (Episode 4-7, before being converted to permanent cast)
Tengger (Episode 5-6)
Yang Zi, Qiao Xin (Episode 6-7)
Jiang Zixin (Episode 8-9)
Chen Long, Zhang Lingzhi (Episode 9-10)
Li Xinjie, Cheng Xiao (Episode 10)
Li Weijia, Caesar Wu, Li Xinran (Episode 11-12)
Wang Ziwen (Episode 12)
Mao Buyi (Episode 12-13)

Season 3
Li Xiaoran (Episode 4)
Qin Hailu (Episode 7-8)
Lai Kuan-lin, Veronique Zheng (Episode 8-9)
Jiao Junyan (Episode 9-10)
Zhang Xueying. Jiang Yiyi (Episode 10-11)
Wang Ke (Episode 12)

Ratings

Season 1 

|-
|01	
| October 7, 2017
|1.089
|6.48
|3
|-	
|02	
| October 14, 2017
|1.036
|6.68
|5
|-	
|03	
| October 21, 2017
|1.070
|6.83
|2
|-	
|04	
| October 28, 2017
|0.918
|6.07
|4
|-
|05	
| November 4, 2017	
|0.914
|5.80
|4
|-	
|06
| November 11, 2017	
|0.959
|6.05
|5

References 

Chinese reality television series
Hunan Television original programming
2017 Chinese television series debuts